Love and War is the twelfth studio album by American country music singer Brad Paisley. It was released on April 21, 2017, through Arista Nashville. The album's lead single is "Today".

Content
The album's originally intended lead single was "Without a Fight", a duet with Demi Lovato, which did not make the album's final track listing. The first single to be included on the album is "Today". Paisley co-produced the album with Luke Wooten.

Included on the album are collaborations with Mick Jagger, John Fogerty, Timbaland, and Bill Anderson. The song "Gold All Over the Ground" is based on a poem written by Johnny Cash in the collection Forever Words.

In April 2017, Paisley released a "visual" version of the album, which features music videos for every song, worked into a singular narrative.

It is Paisley's first album not to feature an instrumental track.

Critical reception

The album has been met with positive critical reception, with most critics showing favor toward the collaborative tracks and Paisley's use of humor. Will Hermes of Rolling Stone rated the album 3 out of 5 stars. He praised the classic rock influences of the title track and "Drive of Shame", while also considering "selfie#theinternetisforever" "entertaining". He added that "Paisley's pro enough that even his apparent phone-ins are well-crafted. But over 16 tracks, you can't help but wish that one of country's greatest would shoot consistently higher than easy chuckles and sentimental homilies." A review by Variety called the album "strong but uneven", praising Paisley's guitar solos and the collaborations with Mick Jagger, while also noting that "there is a lot of familiar thematic ground to cover in fresh ways". Matt Bjorke of Roughstock was also favorable, saying that "After a little bit of time to work on his music outside of the spotlight, Brad Paisley has created, with Love and War, a project which rivals his best work, even if the album is more or less what fans would've wanted out of another Brad Paisley record." Stephen Thomas Erlewine of Allmusic was less positive, rating the album 2.5 stars out of 5 and noting that "While he never pushes too hard -- even the Timbaland tracks don't call attention to the beats -- the shiny production, shopworn jokes, and eager melodies have the cumulative effect of seeming too ready to please any audience that comes his way. Since Paisley still has his skills, this is often enjoyable -- he knows how to craft songs and can play a mean guitar -- but it's hard not to hear Love and War and think Paisley would be a little bit better off if he learned a lesson from Jagger and Fogerty: sometimes, it's better not to try so hard."

Commercial performance
Love and War debuted at No. 1 on Billboards Top Country Albums chart, and at No. 13 on the US Billboard 200, selling 26,000 in pure sales copies in the US, making a total of 29,000 equivalent album units including tracks and streams. It has sold 71,200 copies in the US as of December 2017.

Track listing

Personnel

Vocals
Jessi Alexander – Vocal harmony
Bill Anderson — Featured artist
Hannah Dasher – Vocal harmony
John Fogerty – Featured artist
Audrey Kate Geiger – Vocal harmony
Wes Hightower – Vocal harmony
Mick Jagger – Featured artist 
Gale Mayes – Vocal harmony
Brad Paisley – Primary artist, vocal harmony
Angela Primm – Vocal harmony
Timbaland – Featured artist 
Baylor Wilson – Vocal harmony

Musicians

Brent Anderson – Acoustic guitar
Matt Clifford – Keyboards
Randel Currie – Pedal steel
John Fogerty – Electric guitar
Gary Hooker – Electric guitar
Mick Jagger – Rhythm guitar, tambourine
Daniel Jones – Keyboards, synthesizer 
Kenny Lewis – Bass
Kendall Marcy – Banjo, Hammond B3, keyboards, piano, synthesizer
Gordon Mote – Keyboards, piano
Brad Paisley – Acoustic guitar, dobro, electric guitar, mandolin
Michael Rhodes – Bass
Ben Sesar – Drums
Timbaland – Percussion
Justin Williamson – Fiddle

Production

Matthew Berinato — Art direction
John Carter Cash – Producer
Scott Johnson – Production assistant
Bob Ludwig – Mastering
Kendall Marcy – Executive producer
Brad Paisley – Producer
Timothy Mosley – Producer, programming
Luke Wooten – Producer

Charts

Weekly charts

Year-end charts

References

2017 albums
Arista Records albums
Brad Paisley albums